Thailand participated in the 2009 Southeast Asian Games in the city of Vientiane, Laos from 9 December 2009 to 18 December 2009.

Expectations
General Yuthasak Sasiprapha, the president of the National Olympic Committee of Thailand, told local media that Thailand expected to win about 100 gold medals.

Two years ago, then-hosts Thailand dominated the medals standings with 183 gold out of a total of 477 - well ahead of second-placed Malaysia on 68 and Vietnam on 64.

Medals

References

2009
Southeast Asian Games
Nations at the 2009 Southeast Asian Games